The Episcopal Church in Southeast Florida is a diocese of the Episcopal Church in the United States of America (ECUSA) which extends from Key West, Florida on the south,  to Jensen Beach on the north  and inland to Clewiston on the west.  Major cities in the diocese are Miami, Fort Lauderdale and West Palm Beach. The diocese takes in all of Miami-Dade County, Broward County, Palm Beach County, and Martin County, along with the Florida Keys portion of Monroe County and the eastern part of Hendry County. The diocese is a part of Province IV of the Episcopal Church.
The current Diocesan Bishop of Southeast Florida is the Right Reverend Peter Eaton. The cathedral church of the diocese is Trinity Episcopal Cathedral, Miami. The diocese currently comprises 83 churches.
The philanthropic outreach arm of the Episcopal Church in Southeast Florida is Episcopal Charities of Southeast Florida.

History
The Diocese of Southeast Florida was created in 1969 when the  Diocese of South Florida was split to form the dioceses of Central Florida, Southwest Florida and Southeast Florida.

Bishops of the Diocese
The bishops of the Diocese of Southeast Florida are:
1970-1980 James L. Duncan; was Suffragan Bishop of Episcopal Diocese of South Florida 1961-1969
1980-2000 Calvin Schofield Jr.
2000-2016 Leo Frade
2016 - to date Peter Eaton; was coadjutor 2015–2016

NOTE: For earlier bishops, see the Episcopal Diocese of South Florida

Deaneries
In accordance with the usage in the ECUSA, the diocese is divided into six deaneries each headed by a dean and named as follows: 
 1. The Keys (the Florida Keys portion of Monroe County);
 2. South Dade (southern Miami-Dade County);
 3. North Dade (northern Miami-Dade County);
 4. Broward (Broward County);
 5. South Palm Beach (southern Palm Beach County); and
 6. North Palm Beach (northern Palm Beach County, a portion of eastern Hendry County and all of Martin County).

See also
Episcopal Church (United States)
Christianity
Anglican Communion

References

Bibliography
Cushman, Joseph D., Jr., A Goodly Heritage: The Episcopal Church in Florida, 1821-1892, Gainesville: University of Florida Press (1965)

External links

Journal of the Diocese of Southwest Florida

Southeast Florida
Episcopal Church in Florida
Christian organizations established in 1969
Province 4 of the Episcopal Church (United States)